Christopher Alp is an Australian former Paralympic athlete.

He became a wheelchair user after surviving a plane crash at the age of 12. At the 1980 Arnhem Games, he competed in four athletics events and won bronze medals in the Men's 100 m 3 and Men's 200 m 3 events.  He has been involved in basketball, skiing, cycling and motorsport. In 1985, he competed in the International Wheelchair Basketball Games in England. He has competed in the Targa Tasmania

He is a chartered accountant and has Bachelor of Arts and Bachelor of Commerce degrees from the University of Melbourne. He is a Director of AlpMcNamara, a Melbourne-based company specialising in wealth protection for privately owned businesses.

His philosophy on life is  "I didn’t want to be a blob on society; I wanted to be someone who would be able to help and be useful and really contribute."

References

External links
 Chris Alp at Australian Athletics Historical Results (archive)
 

Paralympic athletes of Australia
Athletes (track and field) at the 1980 Summer Paralympics
Paralympic bronze medalists for Australia
Year of birth missing (living people)
Living people
Medalists at the 1980 Summer Paralympics
Paralympic medalists in athletics (track and field)
Australian male wheelchair racers